Janell Latrice Burse (born May 19, 1979) is a 6'5" women's basketball player who played center for the Seattle Storm of the WNBA.

After playing college ball at Tulane University, Burse was drafted in the second round (28th overall) by the Minnesota Lynx in 2001, and played her first three professional seasons with that team. As part of an ill-fated attempt by the Lynx to land hometown sensation Lindsay Whalen in the 2004 WNBA Draft, Burse was traded with Sheri Sam to the Storm for Amanda Lassiter and a high draft pick.  Whalen was snatched up by the Connecticut Sun, and Seattle gained two key players for its 2004 championship run.

Burse backed up center Kamila Vodichkova in 2004, and took over the starting role when Vodichkova left for the Phoenix Mercury the next season. Fans expected Burse to lose this job to the highly touted Suzy Batkovic when the latter joined the team in mid-season, but Burse played so well that she started the entire year.

Burse, who had purchased a house in Slidell, Louisiana in 2004, became the WNBA's face for relief in the wake of Hurricane Katrina. At two playoff games at KeyArena in September 2005, Burse's charity through the Franklin Avenue Baptist Church raised $25,000 for the relief efforts, which was matched by $75,000 from the team organization.

WNBA career statistics

Regular season

|-
| align="left" | 2001
| align="left" | Minnesota
| 20 || 0 || 8.5 || .333 || .000 || .750 || 2.1 || 0.3 || 0.1 || 0.8 || 1.0 || 2.4
|-
| align="left" | 2002
| align="left" | Minnesota
| 31 || 2 || 11.1 || .373 || .000 || .750 || 1.9 || 0.2 || 0.2 || 0.4 || 0.6 || 2.7
|-
| align="left" | 2003
| align="left" | Minnesota
| 29 || 14 || 15.1 || .490 || .000 || .771 || 3.7 || 0.7 || 0.4 || 1.0 || 1.4 || 7.1
|-
|style="text-align:left;background:#afe6ba;"|  2004†
| align="left" | Seattle
| 29 || 0 || 17.7 || .429 || .000 || .582 || 3.3 || 0.7 || 0.8 || 1.2 || 1.4 || 4.9
|-
| align="left" | 2005
| align="left" | Seattle
| 34 || 34 || 25.3 || .523 || .000 || .699 || 5.9 || 0.7 || 0.6 || 1.2 || 2.3 || 10.0
|-
| align="left" | 2006
| align="left" | Seattle
| 27 || 27 || 27.4 || .511 || 1.000 || .670 || 6.6 || 0.8 || 0.6 || 0.9 || 2.0 || 11.1
|-
| align="left" | 2007
| align="left" | Seattle
| 29 || 29 || 24.4 || .445 || .000 || .693 || 5.3 || 0.8 || 0.4 || 1.0 || 2.0 || 8.8
|-
| align="left" | 2009
| align="left" | Seattle
| 34 || 8 || 15.9 || .510 || .000 || .738 || 3.1 || 0.3 || 0.6 || 0.9 || 1.0 || 6.1
|-
| align="left" | Career
| align="left" | 8 years, 2 teams
| 34 || 8 || 15.9 || .510 || .000 || .738 || 3.1 || 0.3 || 0.6 || 0.9 || 1.0 || 6.1

Playoffs

|-
| align="left" | 2003
| align="left" | Minnesota
| 3 || 3 || 14.0 || .333 || .000 || .667 || 3.0 || 0.7 || 1.3 || 0.7 || 1.0 || 5.3
|-
|style="text-align:left;background:#afe6ba;"|  2004†
| align="left" | Seattle
| 8 || 0 || 13.6 || .444 || .000 || .750 || 2.3 || 0.1 || 1.1 || 1.3 || 1.0 || 3.4
|-
| align="left" | 2005
| align="left" | Seattle
| 3 || 3 || 30.0 || .611 || .000 || 1.000 || 4.7 || 1.0 || 1.0 || 0.3 || 0.7 || 9.3
|-
| align="left" | 2006
| align="left" | Seattle
| 3 || 3 || 27.0 || .385 || .000 || .846 || 3.3 || 0.3 || 0.7 || 1.0 || 0.3 || 10.3
|-
| align="left" | 2009
| align="left" | Seattle
| 3 || 3 || 10.7 || .000 || .000 || .500 || 2.7 || 0.7 || 0.0 || 0.7 || 1.0 || 0.7
|-
| align="left" | Career
| align="left" | 5 years, 2 teams
| 20 || 12 || 17.7 || .402 || .000 || .788 || 3.0 || 0.5 || 0.9 || 0.9 || 0.9 || 5.2

Tulane statistics
Source

References

External links
Seattle Storm Player Profile
WNBA Player Profile
Hurricane Katrina relief

1979 births
Living people
American expatriate basketball people in China
American expatriate basketball people in Poland
American women's basketball players
Basketball players from New Orleans
Centers (basketball)
Liaoning Flying Eagles players
Minnesota Lynx draft picks
Minnesota Lynx players
People from Slidell, Louisiana
Seattle Storm players
Tulane Green Wave women's basketball players